Keith Cameron Smith (born 1971) is an American entrepreneur, self-help and finance author and motivational speaker. Smith is best known for his 10 Distinctions series of motivational books. He has written 10 books. His most popular book is The Top 10 Distinctions Between Millionaires and The Middle Class. His first book, The Spiritual Millionaire: The Spirit Of Wisdom Will Make You Rich, was released in 2004 and garnered him much media attention including Dr. Robert A. Schuller's Hour of Power. He currently resides in central Florida with his wife and five children.

Early life and career 
Smith was born in Shreveport, LA in 1971 to a lower-middle-class family. His father sold auto parts to small garages around town and rarely made more than $25,000 a year. But Smith showed early signs of entrepreneurship. His first entrepreneurial endeavor came when he was in only elementary school. He sold cinnamon-flavored toothpicks to other kids. He bought a bottle of cinnamon oil from a local pharmacy, soaked toothpicks in it each evening, then took them to school the next day, sell them and go home with cash.

In middle school, he would take his lunch money and buy thirty large sticks of gum on his way to school. The gum cost him ten cents a piece and he would sell them for twenty-five cents a piece when he got to school.

After high school, Smith took up golf and him and his friend would go around to golf courses and wade in shallow ponds to find golf balls. They would find a few hundred balls and sell them the next day to a used golf club shop. Eventually, Smith became a cart attendant at a golf course. After a few years, he decided he wanted to become a club pro. He soon became frustrated at the pay and went looking for other opportunities.

His father suggested he sell R-12 Freon for car air conditioners. Smith started selling Freon with a little success. And then fate stepped in. Smith went to an auction one night for fun. He started buying used furniture and selling them at the flea market.

This led him to eventually open his first used furniture store, which turned into a string of furniture stores in Ormond Beach, Fl.

Smith would eventually get involved in real estate investing and become a book author and motivational speaker. His book career got started by self-publishing The Top 10 Distinctions Between Millionaires and the Middle Class in 2005. Within months, sales for this book skyrocketed and Random House quickly purchased the rights to this book. Smith became a self-made millionaire by the age of 33.

Books

Other information 
 Smith became a self-made millionaire at 33.
 Smith only went to college for 2 weeks.
 Smith hosted a radio show for five years called "Flames of Truth".
 Smith invested $100,000 and two years of his life to meet face to face with some of the world's wealthiest people.
 Smith wrote The Top 10 Distinctions Between Millionaires and the Middle Class in seven days in a little cabin in the Smokey Mountains.

References

External links 
 

American business executives
Living people
1971 births
Writers from Shreveport, Louisiana
American self-help writers